Luz del nuevo paisaje is a poetry book by Alejandro Carrión, published in Quito, Ecuador in 1937. The book was illustrated with wood engravings by Eduardo Kingman.  It appeared at the same time as other works by "the poets of Elan" such as “Escafandra” by Ignacio Lasso, “Canto a lo oscuro” by Humberto Vaca Gomez, and “Nuevo itinerario” by Pedro Jorge Vera.

The poem “Buen año” was eventually translated into English and German; and the poem "Luz del nuevo paisaje," into English and French.  The Revista Hispano-Americana of Buenos Aires, directed by Victoriano Lillo Catalán, conferred upon Alejandro Carrión its Hispanic-American Poetry Prize.  Marcos Fingerit invited him to collaborate in their influential magazine Fábula, where the first works of the Spanish poet Camilo José Cela appeared.

In Guayaquil, in 1934 the widely read literary page of El Telégrafo proclaimed “Salteador y guardián,” illustrated by Eduardo Kingman, the best poem of the year; this same poem was awarded the first prize at the First Exhibition of the Mural Poem (Primera Exposición del Poema Mural), in Quito. The American poets Dudley Fitts and Francis St. John translated five poems into English which appeared in the book Five Young American Poets - Third series 1944 (New Directions Publishers - New York) alongside contributions by Tennessee Williams, John Frederick Nims, Jean Garrigue, Eve Merriam and Dudley Fitts.

Ecuadorian poetry collections
1935 poetry books